Richland Township is one of fourteen townships in Madison County, Indiana, United States. At the 2010 census, its population was 4,775 and it contained 2,109 housing units.

Geography

Cities, towns, villages
 Anderson (northeast edge)

Unincorporated towns
 Moonville at

History
Richland was organized in 1834. It was named from their productive farmland.

Volunteer Fire Department 
The Richland Township Volunteer Fire Department is located on County Road 500 N, just east of Alexandria Pike on the west-central side of the township. The fire department provides fire suppression, rescue, and basic life support services to all of Richland Township and mutual aid services to surrounding areas. The fire department is staffed by approximately 35 volunteer members who are trained in fire suppression, emergency medical services, and rescue. The fire department has seven pieces of apparatus: one fire engine (Engine 48), two 3,000-gallon tankers (Engine/Tanker 40 & Tanker 44), one Medium Rescue (Rescue 49), one Grass truck (Grass 47) and two transporting BLS ambulances (Ambulances 45 and 46). Richland is also the home of the Madison County Hazardous Materials Decontamination Team (Decon 40), which has a fully equipped decon trailer, including a mass decontamination tent.  The fire department responds to approximately 400-450 calls for service per year.

The Richland Township Fire Department was established in 1970.

The fire department is dispatched from the Madison County Central Dispatch located in Anderson. The department is addressed on the radio as "Station 40".

The Richland Township Volunteer has had one line-of-duty death, in the 1980s; Donald Lindzy.

Cemeteries
The township contains these six cemeteries: Funk, Heagy, Holson, Moonville, Nelson, and Wesley Chapel.

Major highways
  Indiana State Road 9

Waterways and bodies of water
 Killbuck Creek
Running SW through the township, enters Richland Township near County Road 500 E and County Road 700 N and exits the township near County Road 240 North and Scatterfield Road, just before emptying into the White River.

 Little Killbuck Creek 
Running SSW through the township, enters Richland Township near County Road 800 N and County Road 200 E and empties into the Killbuck Creek near County Road 240 N and Scatterfield Road.
 
 Prosperity Lake
Located just north of County Road 500 N and just east of Alexandria Pike; situated along Little Killbuck Creek.

 Several private ponds

School districts
 Anderson Community School Corporation

Golf course
 Killbuck Golf Course - CLOSED

Political districts
 Indiana's 6th congressional district
 State House District 35
 State House District 36
 State Senate District 26

References
 Helm, Thomas B. History of Madison County, Indiana, with ... Biographical Sketches ... Chicago: Kingman, 1880. Print.
 Madison County Cemeteries Commission
 
 United States Census Bureau 2008 TIGER/Line Shapefiles
 IndianaMap

External links
 Madison County Cemeteries Commission
 Indiana Fire Trucks-Richland Township
 Indiana Township Association
 United Township Association of Indiana
 City-Data.com page for Richland Township

Townships in Madison County, Indiana
Townships in Indiana